Juglans jamaicensis, the West Indian walnut, nogal, or palo de nuez, is a species of walnut in the Juglandaceae family. It is found in Cuba, Hispaniola (the Dominican Republic and Haiti), and Puerto Rico. It is not, in fact, native to Jamaica, as its name would suggest.

This is a large tree which can reach  in height. The compound leaves are each made up of several lance-shaped, toothed leaflets up to 9 centimeters long. Trees bear male and female inflorescences, the male a catkin up to 11 centimeters long and the female an array of flowers at the end of a newly grown shoot. The fruit is a drupe roughly 2 to 3 centimeters long with a black husk and a seed, which is an edible walnut meat, inside.

In Puerto Rico there are only ten to fourteen trees of this species remaining. It is also rare in Cuba and Hispaniola.

It is threatened by habitat loss. It may never have been common, but specimens were likely lost when forest was cleared for coffee plantations on Puerto Rico, and it was probably harvested for wood. The attractive wood is similar to that of the black walnut (Juglans nigra).

This tree has protection under the Endangered Species Act of the United States, where it is listed as an endangered species.

References

jamaicensis
Trees of Cuba
Trees of Haiti
Trees of the Dominican Republic
Trees of Puerto Rico
Taxonomy articles created by Polbot